Leoncito means "little lion" in Spanish. It may also refer to:

Antonio León Amador, better known as "Leoncito", a Spanish professional association football player
Leoncito Astronomical Complex, astronomical observatory in the San Juan Province of Argentina
El Leoncito National Park, a national park of Argentina
2311 El Leoncito, outer main belt asteroid